The BFF U-18 Football League is the top level of the Bangladeshi football league system for youth players under 18 years old where youth teams of Bangladesh Premier League teams compete in. Established in 2022, it is administered by the Bangladesh Football Federation (BFF). 

The league replaces the BFF U-18 Football Tournament as the top tier youth football competition. A total of 12 youth teams compete in a single league format.

History
In September 2022, Bangladesh Football Federation (BFF) inaugurated the first youth football league for the teams of country’s top tier football league, Bangladesh Premier League (BPL). The league consists of youth teams of Bangladesh Premier League sides with players under 18 years old.

Format
The teams would entirely feature U-18 players. The ten teams will play nine matches against each other in a single round league format. A total of 45 matches will be played. The teams occupying league table positions 1, 2 & 3 will be awarded Champions, Runner-up & Third place prize money. The league does not have a relegation system as of the first season.

Champions

Successful clubs by seasons

Performance by clubs

Current teams
.

Stats and players

Seasonal statistics

Top scorers

Awards

Player of the Season

See also
 BFF U-18 Football Tournament
 BFF U-16 Football Tournament
 Football in Bangladesh

References

Football cup competitions in Bangladesh
Sports leagues established in 2022
Youth football in Bangladesh
Football leagues in Bangladesh